Domaljevac-Šamac is a municipality located in Posavina Canton of the Federation of Bosnia and Herzegovina, an entity of Bosnia and Herzegovina. As of 2013, the municipality has a population of 4,771 inhabitants, while the village of Domaljevac has a population of 3,295 inhabitants.

Demographics

Population

Ethnic composition

Sports
The municipality is home to HOK Domaljevac volleyball club.

References

External links 
 http://www.domaljevac.com/
 https://web.archive.org/web/20120419194346/http://www.domaljevac.net/